Fermitin family homolog 3) (FERMT3), also known as kindlin-3 (KIND3), MIG2-like protein (MIG2B), or unc-112-related protein 2 (URP2) is a protein that in humans is encoded by the FERMT3 gene. The kindlin family of proteins, member of the B4.1 superfamily, comprises three conserved protein homologues, kindlin 1, 2, and 3. They each contain a bipartite FERM domain comprising four subdomains F0, F1, F2, and F3 that show homology with the FERM head (H) domain of the cytoskeletal Talin protein. Kindlins have been linked to Kindler syndrome, leukocyte adhesion deficiency, cancer and other acquired human diseases. They are essential in the organisation of focal adhesions that mediate cell-extracellular matrix junctions and are involved in other cellular compartments that control cell-cell contacts and nucleus functioning. Therefore, they are responsible for cell to cell crosstalk via cell-cell contacts and integrin mediated cell adhesion through focal adhesion proteins and as specialised adhesion structures of hematopoietic cells they are also present in podosome's F actin surrounding ring structure. Isoform 2 may act as a repressor of NF-kappa-B and apoptosis

Evolution 

It has been suggested that the evolutionary source of a single ancestral Kindlin protein is the earliest metazoa, the Parazoa. Within vertebrates, these ancestral proteins were subjected to duplication processes in order to arrive at the actual Kindlin family. In comparison with other members of the B4.1 superfamily of proteins, the FERM domains in Kindlin homologues have a greater degree of conservation. The presence of an inserted pleckstrin homology domain within the FERM domain, suggests that the metazoan evolution of the FERM domain is the origination from a proto-talin protein in unicellular or proto-multicellular organisms.

Function 

The FERMT3 protein has a key role in the regulation of hemostasis and thrombosis. This protein may also help maintain the membrane skeleton of erythrocytes. Kindlin 3 is a cytoskeletal signalling protein involved in the activation of the glycoprotein receptor, integrin. Together with the Talin protein it binds cooperatively to beta integrin's cytoplasmic domain causing tail reorientation, thus altering the molecule's conformation. Modification of integrin's conformation serves to dissociate alpha and beta subunits by disrupting their interactions and helping the molecule adopt a high affinity state.  FERMT3 functions as a stabilizer of the cytoskeleton and regulates its dynamics in cell and organelle motility.

Clinical significance 

FERMT3 mutations can result in autosomal recessive leukocyte adhesion deficiency syndrome-III (LAD-III). a deficiency in beta1, beta2 and beta3 integrin activation in platelets and leukocytes that causes haemorrhaging and recurrent infections. Loss of FERMT3 expression in leukocytes compromises their adhesion to the inflamed endothelia and affects neutrophil binding and spreading while selectin mediated rolling is unaffected. It has also been found that FERMT3 lowers Natural Killer cell’s activation threshold, such that a loss of FERMT3 affects single receptor activation of NK cell-mediated cytotoxicity but has no impact on multiple receptors, where the protein deficiency is overcome and target cells are killed.

FERMT3 deficiency on β(2) integrin function depend on both cell type (Natural killer cell or Leukocytes) and the integrin activation stimulus. The prevention of the beta-3 activation is specifically related to LAD-3, causing Glanzmann's thrombasthenia symptoms, a condition in which patients bleed excessively. Leukocyte adhesion deficiency is diagnosed clinically and by complete blood counts that reveal leukocytosis with neutrophilia. Management and treatment of this disease aim to control these recurrent infections by antibiotics and blood transfusions, with bone marrow transplantation as the only curative measure. Failure to express the FERMT3 protein disrupts the ability to form clots and coagulate by preventing integrin αIIβ3-mediated platelet aggregation.

References

Further reading 

 
 </ref>